Astragalus breweri is a species of milkvetch known by the common name Brewer's milkvetch. It is endemic to northern California, where it is found in several counties surrounding the north edge of the San Francisco Bay Area. It grows in open habitat in the North Coast Ranges, sometimes on serpentine soils.

Description
This is a small annual herb producing stems usually only a few centimeters long. The small leaves are made up of widely spaced leaflets with notched tips. The inflorescence arises on a rough-haired peduncle and holds up to ten pealike flowers. Each flower is about a centimeter long and colored white, yellow, or pale lavender, sometimes with light purple streaks. The fruit is an oval-shaped legume pod up to a centimeter long armed with a sharp beak. It contains 2 to 6 beanlike seeds.

References

External links
Jepson Manual Treatment
The Nature Conservancy
USDA Plants Profile
Photo gallery

breweri
Endemic flora of California